Wood violet is a common name for several plants and may refer to:

 Viola odorata, native to Europe and Asia
 Viola riviniana, native to Eurasia and Africa
 Viola sororia, native to eastern North America